Foča-Ustikolina is a municipality located in Bosnian-Podrinje Canton Goražde of the Federation of Bosnia and Herzegovina, an entity of Bosnia and Herzegovina. The seat of the municipality is the village of Ustikolina.

Foča-Ustikolina used to be part of the original Foča municipality, but split itself 1995 and became part of the Federation of Bosnia and Herzegovina.

Foča-Ustikolina has many historic objects dating to the medieval times.

Demographics

Population

Ethnic composition

Gallery

See also
Bosnian Podrinje Canton

References

External links
Mladi Focaci

Populated places in Foča-Ustikolina
Municipalities of the Bosnian Podrinje Canton